Balinese may refer to:
Bali, an Indonesian island
Balinese art
Balinese dance
Balinese people
Balinese language
Balinese script
Balinese (Unicode block)
Balinese mythology
Balinese cat, a cat breed
Balinese Gamelan, local music
Balinese Room, a famous illegal casino in Galveston, Texas
"Balinese", a song by ZZ Top from their 1975 album, Fandango!

Language and nationality disambiguation pages